Prince Somanass was a Prince of Siam (later Thailand). He was a member of the Siamese royal family, son of King Mongkut of Siam and Queen Somanass Waddhanawathy, the first queen consort.

His mother was Queen Somanass Waddhanawathy (a daughter Prince Lakkhananukhun and Nigu Suvarndat). He was given the full name Somdet Phrachao Borom Wong Ther Chao Fa Somanass.

References 

19th-century Thai royalty who died as children
19th-century Chakri dynasty
Thai princes
Thai male Chao Fa
Children of Mongkut
People from Bangkok
1852 births
1852 deaths
Sons of kings